Behrouz Vahidi Azar, born 1952 in Tabriz, is an Iranian violin teacher at the Islamic Republic of Iran Broadcasting music school.

Career
Once in a couple of years, with the financial aid of the parents, he gathers his students into a chamber orchestra and conducts them.

Cultural Concerns
Vahidi Azar has never hesitated to express his concerns to the authorities over the senseless, haphazard importing of the guitar and electric keyboard by self-seeking profiteers. He holds that the two instruments "disrupt children's emotional development", "jeopardize their mental health" and "are not celebrated as much in the manufacturing countries". He is also concerned about "the growth of pub music", "the attraction of music graduates to pubs" and "directorship of orchestras by unqualified people with a background in pubs".

References

 Wikipedia (بهروز وحیدی آذر) The Persian Wikipedia.(retrieved on July 14, 2015)

Iranian classical musicians
Iranian conductors (music)
People from Tabriz
1952 births
Living people
21st-century conductors (music)